Rodney Bennett (24 March 1935 – 3 January 2017) was a British television director. He worked for BBC Radio and directed television programmes for the BBC and ITV.

Early life and education
Bennett was born in Chagford, Devon, and raised in Totnes. He studied psychology at St John's College, Cambridge, and also received a master's degree from University College London.

Career
He began working for the BBC in radio and moved into television with the launch of BBC2. His subsequent work included directing episodes of Z-Cars and three Doctor Who stories, The Ark in Space, The Sontaran Experiment, (both 1975) and The Masque of Mandragora (1976).  He also directed Derek Jacobi and Patrick Stewart in the BBC Shakespeare production of Hamlet in 1980. For ITV he directed the comedy-drama series Anything More Would Be Greedy in 1989 and episodes of The Darling Buds of May.

References

External links 
 
Doctor Who Classic Stats

1935 births
2017 deaths
Alumni of St John's College, Cambridge
Alumni of University College London
BBC people
British television directors
Doctor Who articles lacking infobox image